Ishasha River Camp Airport is an airport serving the Ishasha River Camp and the Queen Elizabeth National Park in Uganda.

Ishasha River Camp is on the Ugandan side of the Ishasha River (which is locally the Uganda-Democratic Republic of the Congo border) and is a base camp for tourist safaris into the Ishasha section of the park. Several trails and roads fan out from the camp into the park.

See also

 Transport in Uganda
 List of airports in Uganda

References

Airports in Uganda